Inghill Johansen  (born 9 June 1958) is a Norwegian writer. She made her literary debut in 1991 with the novel Hjertehvitt. Later books include Suge (1996), Klage (2001) and Forsvinne (2009). She was awarded the Dobloug Prize in 2016.

References

1958 births
Living people
20th-century Norwegian novelists
21st-century Norwegian novelists
Norwegian women novelists
Dobloug Prize winners